Wild Asparagus is a contra dance band from Western Massachusetts that has toured throughout the United States and Canada.

References

Contra dance bands